Feni Polytechnic Institute  is a technical educational institution in Feni, Bangladesh.

References

Further reading
 

Colleges in Feni District
Polytechnic institutes in Bangladesh
Educational institutions established in 1964
1960s establishments in East Pakistan